Revolution of Quebracho was a civil-military uprising of the Colorado Party and the Blanco Party against the presidency of Máximo Santos. It took place in March 1886 in Quebracho, Paysandú Department, Banda Oriental del Uruguay.

Among the revolutionaries were Lorenzo Batlle, Juan Campisteguy and Claudio Williman, future presidents of Uruguay. The preparations for this revolution took place in Buenos Aires and Entre Ríos, when members of the Colorado Party, the Blanco Party, and the Constitutional party agreed to organize an armed uprising against the Santos presidency.

This conflict culminated after the Battle of Soto, in which government troops under the command of General Máximo Tajes, defeated the revolutionary coalition.

References 

Quebracho
Quebracho
Quebracho
History of Uruguay
Paysandú Department